The Consortium of Collegiate Agriculture Organizations is an organization to assist future leaders of the agriculture industry with career opportunities,  leadership development, and new ideas to make their collegiate agriculture organizations more effective. CCAO focuses on the future of the agriculture industry by promoting excellence in future careers.

Mission
 Maximize collaboration of the 17 charter collegiate agricultural organizations
and industry partners to enhance the personal, organizational, career and community education of future leaders.

Members
 Agriculture Future of America (AFA)
 Agricultural Communicators of Tomorrow (ACT)
 Alpha Gamma Rho fraternity (AGR)
 Alpha Gamma Sigma fraternity (AGS)
 Alpha Tau Alpha (ATA)
 Alpha Zeta
 Block and Bridle
 Collegiate 4-H
 Collegiate FFA
 FarmHouse fraternity
 Minorities in Agriculture, National Resources and Related Sciences (MANRRS)
 National Agri-Marketing Association (NAMA)
 National Agricultural Alumni and Development Association (NAADA)
 National Postsecondary Agricultural Student Organization (PAS)
 Professional Landcare Network (PLANET)
 Sigma Alpha sorority

External links
 Collegiate Agriculture Consortium Official Homepage

Agricultural organizations based in the United States